Dr. Võ Tòng Xuân (born 6 September 1940) is former Provost of Tân Tạo University (TTU), the former rector of An Giang University (AGU) and the former vice rector of Can Tho University.  He was also a member of the Board of Trustees of the Rockefeller Foundation from 2002 until 2010.

He is known throughout southern Vietnam as Dr. Rice (as in a medical doctor) because of a popular television show which he presented that taught farmers better techniques for growing and cultivating rice.  He was also instrumental in the eradication of the brown planthopper bug which, throughout the 1970s was destroying paddy rice.  Part of the problem in eradicating the bug infestation was the type of collectivization imposes on the farmers of southern Vietnam.    He also helped to bring about reforms in the early 1980s that can be seen as catalysts to the Doi Moi reforms of 1986.

His activities were a key driver of Vietnam becoming one of the world's largest rice exporters.

Notable Positions within International Organizations

 Member, Board of Trustees of the Rockefeller Foundation (2002 to 2010)
 Member, Board of Governors, Asian Institute of Management in Manila (1997 to date)
 Member, Board of Trustees of the International Potato Center at Lima, Peru (1996–99; 2016 to date).
 Research fellow and trustee of the International Rice Research Institute.
 Member, Board of Directors of the International Fertilizer Development Center (2007-2017)

Notable International Awards

 Recipient of the Ramon Magsaysay Award for International Understanding in 1993.
 Canada's Certificate of recognition for his "Dedication and contribution to the world of sciences"
 France's "Chevalier de l'Ordre du Merite Agricole Medal"
 Japan's Nikkei Asia Prize for Regional Growth
 Philippines's D.L. Umali Award
 Australia's 2005 ASTD Derek Tribe Award. Currently, he is a Fellow of the Australian Academy of Science and Technology.

References

Living people
1940 births
People from An Giang Province
Asian Institute of Management people
Winners of the Nikkei Asia Prize
Agronomists